The Year-End charts for the Regional Mexican Albums chart in the 1980s are published in the last issue of Billboard magazine every year. The chart was based on information provided by Nielsen Broadcast Data Systems, which collected a survey from music retail shops and one-stop sales in the United States until May 1991 when the methodology was changed to include point-of-sale data compiled from Nielsen SoundScan. The Year-End charts represent aggregated numbers from the weekly charts that were compiled for each artist, album and record company.

Regional Mexican Albums of the Year

  – represents the best-performing single of the year.

1987, 1988, 1989,

References

United States Regional Mexican
Regional Mexican Albums Year-end Chart, 1980s
Regional Mexican music albums